Balloon race may refer to:

 Balloon Race (ride), a type of fairground ride
 A competitive event based on a balloon release
 A competitive event in hot air ballooning